Sean Kenny is a rugby league footballer who plays as a  for Thatto Heath Crusaders in the National Conference League.

He has previously played for the Salford Red Devils in the Super League and the Swinton Lions in the Kingstone Press Championship.

References

Living people
English rugby league players
Rugby league hookers
Salford Red Devils players
Place of birth missing (living people)
Year of birth missing (living people)